Liantang'ao Town is an urban town in You County, Hunan Province, People's Republic of China.

Cityscape
The town is divided into 20 villages and eight communities, the following areas: Tonglian Community, Shanbei Community, Zhehe Community, Chunlian Community, Shuangfeng Community, Chunfeng Community, Liangjiang Community, Gaolou Community, Xinhua Village, Xinchao Village, Yanlong Village, Panlong Village, Panlian Village, Jutian Village, Juzhou Village, Chuntanglong Village, Yangshengguan Village, Liaogong Village, Xinghe Village, Zhongjiang Village, Shantian Village, Xianfeng Village, Youju Village, Xiadong Village, Xiatian Village, Yinkeng Village, Yantou Village, and Nanshui Village.

References

External links

Divisions of You County